Javaid Edward Siddiqi (born April 9, 1977) is an American educator who served as Virginia Governor Bob McDonnell's Secretary of Education from November 2013 to January 2014. After attending Chesterfield County Public Schools from kindergarten until his graduation from Matoaca High School, he served for a number of years as a science teacher and school administrator in the district. In 2011, he was appointed as Deputy Secretary of Education and in 2013 was made Secretary. He served on the Chesterfield County school board, representing the Midlothian district until January 2020.

References

External links
 Virginia Secretary of Education

Living people
1977 births
State cabinet secretaries of Virginia
Virginia Commonwealth University alumni
Virginia State University alumni
People from Columbia, South Carolina
People from Midlothian, Virginia
School board members in Virginia
21st-century American politicians